Alphonse Hörning was a Swiss bobsledder who competed from the late 1930s to the late 1940s. He won a gold medal in the four-man event at the FIBT World Championships, earning it in 1939.

References
Bobsleigh four-man world championship medalists since 1930

Possibly living people
Swiss male bobsledders
Year of birth missing
20th-century Swiss people